is a first-person survival horror adventure game developed by Team Bughouse and published by SunSoft for the Sony PlayStation. It was released in Japan on January 17, 1997; and in Europe on October 1 of the same year. The game was not released in North America.

Story 
The game is set in January, 1997. Akira, a freelance occult journalist, is visited by a woman whose daughter left on a trip with her friends and never returned. He agrees to look for the woman's daughter, and is given the last things the woman received from her, including a photo of an old run-down mansion somewhere in Europe, and what seem to be unearthly spirits. Two weeks after this meeting, Akira and his partner Angela find themselves in a remote European village in front of the mansion shown in the photos, where the game begins.

Characters 
Akira (Aged 23) A freelance occult journalist for the past three years, who has never written an article based on an actual paranormal experience. His work so far has been selling fake ghost photos and fabricated articles to specialist magazines.
Angela (Aged 21) Akira's partner, who accompanies him to Europe to help him find the missing teenagers.
Linda, Toshi, Dave (Agesd 18, 17, 18) The missing senior high school students who Akira and Angela have been tasked with locating.
Paulo: (Aged 26) Akira and Angela first meet Paulo in the mansion, and he seems extremely knowledgeable about the occult and the mansion.

Reception

References

External links 
The Note game profile on IGN

1997 video games
Action video games
Horror video games
PlayStation (console)-only games
Sunsoft games
Video games developed in Japan
PlayStation (console) games